The Sema domain is a structural domain of semaphorins, which are a large family of secreted and transmembrane proteins, some of which function as repellent signals during axon guidance.  Sema domains also occur in the hepatocyte growth factor receptor, Plexin-A3  and in viral proteins.

CD100 (also called SEMA4D) is associated with PTPase and serine kinase activity. CD100 increases PMA, CD3 and CD2 induced T cell proliferation, increases CD45 induced T cell adhesion, induces B cell homotypic adhesion and down-regulates B cell expression of CD23.

The Sema domain is characterised by a conserved set of cysteine residues, which form four disulfide bonds to stabilise the structure. The Sema domain fold is a variation of the beta propeller topology, with seven blades radially
arranged around a central axis. Each blade contains a four- stranded (strands A to D) antiparallel beta sheet. The inner strand of each blade (A) lines the channel at the centre of the propeller, with strands B and C of the same repeat radiating outward, and strand D of the next repeat forming the outer edge of the blade. The large size of the Sema domain is not due to a single inserted domain but results from the presence of additional secondary structure elements inserted in most of the blades. The Sema domain uses a 'loop and hook' system to close the circle between the first and the last blades. The blades are constructed sequentially with an N-terminal beta- strand closing the circle by providing the outermost strand (D) of the seventh (C-terminal) blade. The beta-propeller is further stabilized by an extension of the N-terminus, providing an additional, fifth beta-strand on the outer edge of blade 6.

Human proteins containing this domain 
MET;       MST1R;     PLXNA1;    PLXNA2;    PLXNA3;    PLXNA4;    PLXNB1;    PLXNB2;
PLXNB3;    PLXND1;    SEMA3A;    SEMA3B;    SEMA3C;    SEMA3D;    SEMA3E;    SEMA3F;
SEMA3G;    SEMA4A;    SEMA4B;    SEMA4C;    SEMA4D;    SEMA4F;    SEMA4G;    SEMA5A;
SEMA5B;    SEMA6A;    SEMA6B;    SEMA6C;    SEMA6D;    SEMA7A;

References 

Protein domains
Protein families
Single-pass transmembrane proteins